Senator Hubbard may refer to:

Arthur J. Hubbard Sr. (1912–2014), Arizona State Senate
Carroll Hubbard (born 1937), Kentucky State Senate
Charles Hubbard (artist) (1801–1875), Massachusetts State Senate
Chester D. Hubbard (1814–1891), West Virginia State Senate
David Hubbard (politician) (1792–1874), Alabama State Senate
Elbert H. Hubbard (1849–1912), Iowa State Senate
Henry Hubbard (1784–1857), U.S. Senator from New Hampshire from 1835 to 1841
John F. Hubbard Jr. (1822–1893), New York State Senate
John F. Hubbard (1795–1876), New York State Senate
John Henry Hubbard (1804–1872), Connecticut State Senate
Levi Hubbard (1762–1836), Massachusetts State Senate
Lucius Frederick Hubbard (1836–1913), Minnesota State Senate
William Blackstone Hubbard (1795–1866), Ohio State Senate